Parker Pyne Investigates is a short story collection written by Agatha Christie and first published in the UK by William Collins and Sons in November 1934. Along with The Listerdale Mystery, this collection did not appear under the usual imprint of the Collins Crime Club but instead appeared as part of the Collins Mystery series. It appeared in the US later in the same year published by Dodd, Mead and Company under the title Mr. Parker Pyne, Detective. The UK edition retailed at seven shillings and sixpence (7/6) and the US edition at $2.00.

The collection comprises twelve of her fourteen stories featuring detective James Parker Pyne; the two remaining stories, Problem at Pollensa Bay and The Regatta Mystery were later collected in The Regatta Mystery in 1939 in the US and in Problem at Pollensa Bay in the UK in 1991 although these were originally stories featuring Hercule Poirot when they were first published in the Strand Magazine in 1935 and 1936 respectively.

The book also features the first appearance of the characters of Ariadne Oliver and Miss Felicity Lemon, both of whom would go on to have working relationships with Hercule Poirot in later books.

Plot introduction 

James Parker Pyne is a retired government employee who considers himself to be a "detective of the heart". Advertising his services in the "Personal" column of The Times, he works alongside his secretary Miss Lemon, novelist Ariadne Oliver, handsome "lounge lizard" Claude Luttrell and disguise artist Madeleine de Sara.

The first six stories deal with Pyne solving cases in England, while the second six stories detail Pyne's vacation, where he hopes not to have to do detective work only to end up helping others anyway.

Plot summaries

The Case of the Middle-aged Wife 

The marriage of George and Maria Packington is in difficulties. Mr. Packington has started to see a young typist named Nancy. When his wife protests, he states that he is merely trying to bring some happiness into the girl's life and that there is nothing in their relationship. At the end of her tether, Maria sees Parker Pyne's advertisement in the personal column of the paper which reads: "Are you happy? If not, consult Mr. Parker Pyne."

Maria goes to the address given and Parker Pyne instantly guesses the cause of her unhappiness from his knowledge of life and his previous occupation in statistics. He tells Maria that his fee is two hundred guineas, the sum to be paid up front. At first reluctant, Maria returns to the office with the money, as Pyne predicted. He has already lined up one of his associates, a good-looking young man called Claude Lutterell, and he tells her that she will receive instructions tomorrow.

That night George Packington is surprised at his wife's non-combative attitude towards him. The next day, Maria is sent for a beauty treatment and a dress-fitting followed by lunch at the Ritz Hotel with Pyne where she is introduced to Claude. Something of a whirlwind romance of ten days follows which culminates in a dance one night when Maria and Claude cross paths with George and his girl at a dance. George is jealous and shocked at his wife's behaviour and a couple of days later the two are reconciled. At the same time, Maria has grown closer to Claude who breaks off his relationship with her and confesses the shame of his past to her as a gigolo who uses women. He promises to reform and keep Maria updated with his progress with an annual advert in the personal column. It turns out that this confession was also planned and the advert arranged by Pyne to give a lasting romance to Maria. Pyne is satisfied that he has successfully saved a marriage (at a profit to himself).

The Case of the Discontented Soldier 

Major Charles Wilbraham calls at Parker Pyne's office. He has recently returned after many years in the service of the Empire in East Africa and is retired. As Pyne instantly concludes, he is bored stiff living in an English village after a lifetime of excitement and adventure. Pyne charges him fifty pounds and instructs him to take Madeleine de Sara to lunch. She returns a few hours later unsuccessful: she has frightened the Major off, as he thinks her something of a vamp; his tastes run to fair-haired, blue-eyed women. Pyne consults a list and decides that Freda Clegg will be suitable...

The next day Wilbraham receives note from Pyne instructing him to go to an address in Friar's Lane, Hampstead and call at a house named "Eaglemont." In Friar's Lane, Wilbraham hears cries for help and going into an empty house sees a young blond-haired, blue-eyed woman being attacked by two black men. He fights them off and takes the young lady for a coffee to help her get over her attack.

She tells her story: her name is Freda Clegg and she is an orphan. The previous week she received a visit from an Australian lawyer who told her she might come into a legacy from business transacted by her late father but that it was dependent upon her having some papers of his. She handed him all of the papers she has, having no idea what the matter could be about and then received a letter from him asking her to call on him at his house, "Whitefriars" in Friar's Lane – the empty house, and it was there she was attacked and Wilbraham saved her. The Major's theory is that there is something in her father's papers that the man posing as a lawyer wants desperately. Freda remembers that she thought her room had been searched when she was out and that this attack was possibly to take such papers by force from Freda if she had them on her person, or to force her to tell where they are.

They go to her room in lodgings in Notting Hill and in a slit in the lining of her father's old chest find a document which the Major recognises as being written in Swahili. The Major can understand the writing and realises that it refers to a hidden cache of expensive ivory. The Major asks if he can keep the document for the moment and will call on her tomorrow at half-past-six when he has thought of a plan of action.

As promised, he returns the next night but finds a note from Freda asking him to join her at "Whitefriars." He buys a stamp from the landlady, posts a letter and then proceeds to Hampstead. Entering the empty house, he is soon knocked on the head and regains consciousness in the cellar. Freda is also there and the two of them are bound. She tells him that she too received a letter, purportedly from the Major, asking her to go to "Whitefriars". Suddenly the voice of the lawyer booms in the darkness. The two of them have interfered in his plans and he must dispose of them. A trickle of water starts to pour from a hole in the wall into the room and Freda realises that they are meant to drown. She remains somewhat calm while the Major strains successfully at his bonds. He frees himself, then her and they flee the house. Freda is full of admiration for Wilbraham and he impulsively proposes. She accepts and then worries about her father's paper which is missing from his pocket. He tells her that what they took was a spoof copy and he posted her father's paper on to his tailor in the envelope in Notting Hill.

Parker Pyne visits Mrs Oliver, the novelist and congratulates her on the story she thought up for him to use with the Major and Freda, although he thinks the cellar of water was something of a cliché. "Whitefriars" is a house Pyne bought long ago which he has so far used for eleven exciting dramas.

The Wilbrahams, happily married, are in Africa. Without telling each other, both think that they paid money to Pyne and he did not provide anything for them. Neither bears a grudge though – if they had not gone to see Pyne, the train of events that led to them meeting would never have happened...

The Case of the Distressed Lady

A young lady calls at Parker Pyne's office. Her name is Mrs. Daphne St. John and she says that she is in a great deal of trouble and needs help. She produces a diamond ring that Pyne examines and declares to be worth at least two thousand pounds. Daphne tells him that she stole it from a friend of hers, because she was in desperate straits. The background is that her husband is careful with money and does not know that she has got herself into debt. Daphne went with friends to Le Touquet and lost a great deal of money in the casino. 

Soon afterwards she went to stay in the country at the house of Sir Reuben Dortheimer whose wife, Naomi, was at school with Daphne. During the visit the setting of the diamond ring became loose and Naomi asked Daphne to take it to Bond Street for her to be fixed. Instead, Daphne had a paste copy made and pawned the real ring for money to pay off her debts, the paste being sent to Lady Dortheimer. 

Soon after, she came into some money when a cousin died and has now reclaimed the real ring. However she cannot return it as the husbands have quarrelled and the two couples are no longer on speaking terms. In addition, Naomi's character would not allow forgiveness of such an act of theft, if Daphne was to confess. She has heard news that Lady Dortheimer is thinking of having the stone reset. The jeweller she will send it to is bound to notice that it is a paste copy. 

Asked for ideas, Daphne admits that she has heard that the Dortheimers are going to be having a party on the coming Wednesday and she needs some exhibition dancers. After she has left the office, Pyne calls in Claude Luttrell and Madeleine de Sara and tells them that they are going to be famous dancers...

The party and the exhibition dance go well. Lady Naomi Dortheimer is very taken with Jules, the dancer (in reality, Claude) and they are on the dancefloor when the lights suddenly go out, as arranged by Madeleine out in the hall. In the darkness, Lady Naomi's ring "slips" from her finger, but is soon replaced by Claude.

Daphne calls at Pyne's office the next morning. He passes her his bill for expenses, which she pays in cash. Pyne then gives her the ring. He has had it examined and it is definitely a paste copy. Daphne seems a little put out at this. Pyne tells her that he knows that she is in reality Ernestine Richards, who is the secretary of Lady Dortheimer. The ring she brought in the previous visit was the paste copy which Richards wanted Pyne and his people to substitute for the real thing, absolving her of any real crime. He does not charge her a fee as he has not made her happy, as his advert had promised. The angry young lady storms out of the office.

The Case of the Discontented Husband

Parker Pyne receives a new client. Reginald Wade is a slightly inarticulate young man whose marriage is in a mess. His wife of nine years has given him six-months' notice that unless he changes his ways she wants a divorce. He leads a blameless life, playing golf and tennis whereas Mrs Wade likes the arts – galleries, operas and concerts. She is bored with her husband and she has become friends with a long-haired art lover called Sinclair Jordan. Pyne's solution to the problem is for Reggie to have a mild flirtation with a beautiful woman. This will make Iris Wade jealous and also make her think twice about Reggie's attractiveness to women. Although he admits that there is a possibility that Iris is so completely in love with Jordan that the plan will fail, Pyne thinks the scheme has a ninety-seven percent chance of success and he charges Wade two hundred guineas, payable in advance.

Reggie subsequently "invites" Madeleine de Sara down to his house for the weekend, with his wife's agreement and to her amusement. She is pleased that her divorce will be simpler in that Reggie will not be so upset, but she is less pleased to see the attraction between the pair and the compliments that Miss de Sara bestows upon Reggie. Madeleine makes small comments about his ability as a golf teacher and how not playing a sport makes one feel left out. She also compliments Iris on letting Reggie have such friendships when other jealous women wouldn't. Little by little, Iris' veneer of acceptance starts to slip away.

Later that day Reggie and Madeleine take a walk in the rose garden and, seeing that Iris is watching them from the terrace, Madeleine makes Reggie kiss her. Iris is livid and in a private row with Reggie threatens a separation. Madeleine tells him to suggest that he leaves as she won't like the idea of him being alone in London, "amusing" himself. A war of nerves breaks out between the couple, but Madeleine tells him to keep calm – at this rate, all will be well in less than a fortnight.

A week later, Madeleine returns to Pyne's office and reports on the case. Matters reached a head when Sinclair Jordan joined the house party. He fell for Madeleine, but she made outrageous fun of him and his appearance. Iris demanded that Reggie throw her out, but he told his wife he wanted to marry Madeleine as per her instructions to him. Iris has staged a collapse, but Reggie has nevertheless gone to town and Madeleine is sure that Iris is following him to effect a reconciliation on his terms. Suddenly the office door bursts open and Reggie runs in, proclaiming his genuine love for Madeleine. Iris quickly follows and a scene ensues, ended by Madeleine when she screams hysterically for them to get out. They leave and Pyne accepts responsibility for this turn of events. He writes across the file that this case's result was a "failure" but that the result "should have been foreseen."

The Case of the City Clerk

Parker Pyne receives his next customer: Mr. Roberts is a city clerk of forty-eight years of age. He is happily married with two healthy children and a steady job. However his life has been one of steady work and survival with no moments of adventure. He consequently feels in a rut. His wish is to "live gloriously", if only for a few minutes. He can only afford to pay five pounds for this privilege but Pyne accepts this offer, although warning Mr. Roberts that danger could be involved...

Pyne goes to the Bon Voyageur restaurant and meets a Mr Bonnington there. The previous evening, an absent-minded professor called Petersfield was murdered in an attempt to steal some secret plans from him. Fortunately, the plans were not taken but they have got to be sent safely to the League of Nations in Geneva. Their usual agents to carry out this task are either indisposed or, in the case of one by the name of Hooper, are not trusted as he is suspected of being a double agent. Pyne knows of someone who could take on the case...

Consequently, Mr. Roberts, his wife and children fortuitously staying with her mother, finds himself travelling by first-class sleeper train from London to Geneva and a hotel where he will receive further instructions. He is not told the true nature of what he is carrying but that it is a cryptogram revealing the hiding place of the Romanov crown jewels. He arrives safely in Geneva and meets a tall bearded man who makes himself known to Roberts. The man gives him instructions to take a sleeper train for Paris. Roberts is also given password phrases to exchange with his next contact, and a revolver for safety.

The next day at the station, he soon bumps into a glamorous foreign girl who uses the correct password phrases with him and tells him to meet her in her next-door compartment after they have passed the border. He does so and the girl reveals that she is frightened as someone called Vassilievitch is on the train in the compartment on the other side of hers. He is out to murder the girl and get the jewels. At Roberts' offer, she passes him a rolled-stocking with the jewels secreted inside for him to look after during the night. Embarrassed, he turns down her suggestion that he should sleep in her compartment to keep an eye on her. He does agree to sleep in the connecting washroom. 

In the hours of darkness, Roberts thinks that he hears a noise coming from her compartment. He quickly enters it. She has gone and there is a smell of chloroform in the air. At the end of the carriage, Roberts spots the sleeping conductor and his discarded jacket and cap. Disguising himself as that official, he gets Vassilievitch to open his door. Roberts pushes past him, locks the Russian out and unties the bound and gagged girl. They wait in the man's compartment until the next morning and upon arrival in Paris go on an extended run through the city in a bid to shake off any pursuers. 

The duo fly from Le Bourget to Croydon where they are met by a man identified as Count Paul Stepanyi (who looks similar to the tall bearded man in Geneva) who takes them to a country house. The stockings are handed over and Mr. Roberts is given a jewel-encrusted order in a Morocco case as thanks. He is also introduced to the girl properly – the Grand Duchess Olga. After Mr. Roberts has gone, the Grand Duchess, aka Madeleine de Sara, in reality Maggie Sayers, goes home to Streatham.

Pyne meets with Bonnington again. The plans were successfully transferred and he admits to giving his courier another more embellished story as a gun would seem too mundane. Three agents of the other side meet in Paris, annoyed that their plans failed and they blame each other for their loss.

Mr. Roberts sits at home reading a book. Pyne sends onto him a cheque for fifty pounds with thanks from "certain people". Mr. Roberts is more than satisfied that he has had his bit of adventure.

The Case of the Rich Woman

Parker Pyne receives an original problem from his latest customer: Mrs. Abner Rymer is the widow of a man who worked out a new engineering process which made him a rich man. She was a farmgirl who was courted by Rymer and married him when they had no money and lived through years of gruelling poverty. When he first struck his riches, the two people at first enjoyed their new life of luxury. But the novelty of servants, foreign trips, expensive clothes and food soon wore off. Abner Rymer was a weak man physically and his new-found wealth could not reverse his deterioration. He died at the relatively young age of forty-three some five years ago.  Mrs Rymer has no friends now; her old friends are shy of her new lifestyle and her newer acquaintances are always after subscriptions. She feels certain that they are snobbish about her behind her back. She basically wants help in spending money in an enjoyable way, but without giving it away. Pyne promises to restore her interest in life and charges her one thousand pounds up-front for his service. After she has gone, Pyne tells Claude Luttrell that the services of Dr. Antrobus will be needed...

A week later he calls Mrs Rymer back to his office and introduces her to Nurse de Sara who takes the lady up one floor to the waiting Dr. Constantine. He appears to be of eastern extraction and the room is decorated in oriental fashion. Mrs Rymer is told that she has a sickness of the mind, not of the body. She is given a cup of coffee to drink, and then falls asleep...

...and wakes up in bed in a somewhat bare room. She is soon attended by a plump little woman in an apron called Mrs Gardner and an elderly doctor who both call her "Hannah". They say that she had a seizure two days previously, and has been unconscious ever since.  She will soon be up and about. She should not worry about her work, as a Mrs Roberts has been helping Mrs Gardner. 

When the duo leave her alone, Mrs Rymer goes to the window and sees that she is in a farmhouse. Later she questions Mrs Gardner who tells her that she has lived there for five years and even shows her a photograph of her and the other residents together. She keeps her thoughts to herself for the moment. She soon sees a newspaper which confirms that some three days have passed since she was in Pyne's office. She also sees a report that Mrs Abner Rymer has been removed to a private nursing home. She reportedly has delusions that she is a servant girl named Hannah Moorhouse. Rymer also sees in another column a report that a Dr. Constantine has given a lecture stating that it is possible to transfer the soul of a person into the body of another. Mrs Rymer is furious with Pyne but, bearing in mind the newspaper story of her transfer to a nursing home for mental delusions, she is not sure just what she can do or say that will be believed.

She bides her time at the farm, carrying out "Hannah"'s duties which, in themselves, take her back to her old life with some ease. After several weeks, she has saved up enough money to be able to afford the trip back to London, with the intention to confront Pyne. Yet she hesitates, again afraid of what the result might be. She is also mindful that a change of scene does a person good.

Months go by and Mrs Rymer becomes good friends with Joe Welsh, a widowed farmhand. They enjoy the lambing season in Spring, walks in the Summer and the harvest in October. It is on the eighth of that month, and almost a year has passed since her new life started, when she looks up from her work in the vegetable patch and sees Pyne watching her from over a fence. She starts to curse him and he admits to all the deceptions. He agrees that Hannah Moorhouse never existed and tells her that Mrs Gardner is in on the act. Pyne has had Mrs Rymer's power of attorney for the past year and her fortune has been safe and actually improved in the interim. He asks her a simple question: "Are you happy?"

Mrs Rymer stops at this question and admits that she is. She and Joe have become engaged and she is satisfied with having her old life back. She tells Pyne she wants just seven hundred pounds of her fortune to buy her and Joe a farm which they want. Pyne can distribute the rest to hospitals, but her new husband is never to know of her previous life. Pyne agrees and leaves another satisfied client behind him.

Have You Got Everything You Want?

A young, attractive woman named Elsie Jeffries boards the Orient Express at the Gare de Lyon. She is shown to her compartment but is obviously in something of a mental quandary. Once the journey has started, she makes her way to the restaurant car. She spots that the suitcase in the next door compartment to hers is labelled "Parker Pyne", and this triggers something in her memory. She checks the personal column of The Times but doesn't see what she expected to see there. Going to the restaurant car again, she is placed on the same table as the owner of the case and strikes up a conversation with him. She asks him if he is the same Parker Pyne of The Times''' adverts. He confirms that he is and he asks her whether she is unhappy. She confesses that she is. The cause is her husband of the past eighteen months. He is a sober and puritanical soul, who has been working in Constantinople for two weeks. She is on her way to join him. One week ago, in his study, she found a piece of blotting paper. On the paper was part of a message, which referred to her. It used the words, "just before Venice would be the best time." She cannot imagine what is going to happen to her when the train reaches this point. Pyne checks when they will arrive at Venice, and promises to help.

The next day they are almost at the appointed spot when there is a cry of "Fire!" The two rush out into the corridor where a Slavic woman is pointing to the smoke coming out of one of the compartments further down the train. The conductor assures the passengers that there is no emergency. Pyne is suspicious, and returns to Elsie's compartment. He finds the Slavic woman there, supposedly recovering from the shock. Pyne refuses to let her leave when she wishes to. When Elsie returns, Pyne asks her to sort through her belongings. She does so and finds that her jewellery are missing. The Slavic woman is detained in Venice, but the jewels are not found on her and she has to be released. On the way to Trieste, Pyne and Elsie discuss the puzzle of where the jewels could possibly be. No one else had the opportunity to take them. The Slavic woman could not have thrown them to someone outside the train, as they were on the bridge passing over the sea. They have not been hidden in the compartment. Pyne decides that he must send a telegram at Trieste...

The train reaches Constantinople and Pyne meets Edward Jeffries. He asks Elsie to meet him at the Tokatlian Hotel in thirty minutes time. She does so, and he hands all of her jewellery back to her. He refuses to say how he recovered it. He leaves the hotel and goes to a café where Edward Jeffries joins him by appointment. It was Jeffries who received Pyne's telegram and handed the jewels back. 

Pyne tells him about his wife finding the message on the blotter. He puts it to Jeffries that the jewels were actually taken by him before he left London. He only left paste copies behind. It was these that had to be "stolen" again and disappear at some other point. In a way that would not bring an accusation on any innocent person. The point before Venice is the only time on the journey that the jewels could be taken and thrown into water, and not end up in land where they could be found. 

Pyne suspects that Jeffries is not a thief, but a victim. Edward confesses that he has been blackmailed for some time by a Mrs. Rossiter. They shared a bedroom together in the West Indies, on the purely innocent grounds of protecting her from her supposedly violent husband. It was a scam and Jeffries has been suffering ever since. Needing the money for the latest demand, he "stole" his wife's jewels. Pyne tells him to leave the blackmailer to him and to confess all to his wife. Everything, except for the fact of being scammed in the West Indies. He is sure Elsie will be delighted to believe that she has reformed a rake.

The Gate of Baghdad

Parker Pyne is on a vacation in the Middle East, and is currently in Damascus. He is soon to set off on the -long journey across the Syrian Desert from Damascus to Baghdad by a Pullman motor coach that will traverse the wastes in some thirty-six hours instead of the months that the trip used to take. There are various other people sharing the journey including the young attractive Netta Pryce and her austere aunt; three Royal Air Force officers called O'Rourke, Loftus and Williamson; a Mr Hensley of the Baghdad public works department; an old Etonian called Captain Smethurst; General Poli, an Italian; and an Armenian mother and her son.

The day before the journey, Pyne passes the time by talking to General Poli about items in the newspaper. The main news item discussed is the search for a crooked financier called Samuel Long, who is on the run and is rumoured to be in South America. Pyne goes to the cinema and then to a somewhat seedy nightclub. In the club, he finds a slightly drunken Captain Smethurst. Smethurst seems depressed, but is vague as to the reason why. He claims that he does not "like to go back on a pal". Pyne introduces his profession, glibly announcing that he is a sort of "confidence trickster". This prompts a strange reaction from the Captain, who asks, "What – you too?"

The journey starts the next day. The bus driver is worried about the possibility of them getting stuck in the desert mud after their stop at Ar Rutba. There have been heavy rains in the area. Sure enough, the bus does become bogged down as it drives through the night. The men step out to assist in freeing it. As they work, they realise that Smethurst is not assisting in their effort. When O'Rourke investigates, he finds the Captain's corpse in his seat. Loftus, a doctor in the RAF, suggests that he may have hit his head on the roof of the vehicle as it went over one of the heavy bumps on the ground. Loftus examines the corpse, and declares that he cannot find an obvious wound. The only other possibility is that he was hit with something in the nature of a sandbag whilst the other passengers were asleep. 

As the passengers discuss the reason why someone would do such a thing, Williamson remembers overhearing a conversation that Smethurst had with an unknown third party in Damascus. Smethurst said that he would keep quiet, until they arrived in Baghdad. But not a moment longer. Pyne joins in with his story of his own conversation with the dead man in the nightclub. Loftus also recalls Smethurst talking to Hensley about "a leakage" in his department. Recalling that Hensley said he always carried spare socks with him, Pyne suggests that Loftus should fetch these. Sure enough, one is found to contain wet sand. Pyne now knows the murderer.

Pyne examines the body more closely. Loosening the collar, he finds a small stab wound made by something in the nature of a stiletto. Pyne suggests that within their party is the absconding financier Samuel Long, who is travelling in disguise. Smethurst knew of this, which would explain his unusual reaction to Pyne's statement that he works as a confidence trickster. Pyne declares that Loftus is Mr. Long. Within his doctor's kit, he would have something which could have caused Smethurst's death. Loftus was also quick to pinpoint the cause of death as being a bump on the head, prompted by an earlier conversation reminiscing about the former rigours of the journey. The final proof is that he tried to pass suspicion onto Hensley. Pyne had already examined Hensley's socks before he asked "Loftus". At that moment, they were free of sand.

Samuel Long lights a cigarette and languidly confesses. He met the real Loftus in Egypt and bought his identity for twenty thousand pounds. Smethurst was his fag at Eton and recognised him. He did not give him away instantly, as he had a case of hero worship for the man when he was younger.

Long suddenly collapses and Pyne theorises that the cigarette contained prussic acid. He has escaped justice.

The House at Shiraz

Parker Pyne is still in the orient on his way to Teheran, then Shiraz. He is taking the route by a monoplane flown on the first leg on the journey by a young German pilot called Herr Schlagal. Disappointed with the modernity of Teheran, Pyne invites Schlagal to dine with him. They talk about his job, flying across the Middle East. The pilot tells Pyne of his first two passengers, a young titled lady called Esther Carr and her beautiful companion who Schlagal fell in love with. Soon after, the second young woman was dead. Schlagal suspects Lady Esther of the murder, seeing insanity in her eyes and in her manner. Pyne knows of Lady Esther's parents and of her family. Insanity has been a curse for them for several generations.

Arriving in Shiraz on the second day of the Nowruz festival, Pyne makes the acquaintance of the English consul and dines with him. He enquires after a striking house that he saw just outside the town on a visit to the tomb of Hafez, the poet. The consul tells him that this is none other than the home of Lady Esther. She now lives as a recluse, refusing to see anyone from her old country. The consul took over his post the very day after the death of the companion. The woman fell from a balcony in the courtyard, while carrying a breakfast tray.  The consul also mirrors some of the comments of the German pilot about the strangeness of Lady Esther. He describes speaks her "dark, flashing eyes".

The next day, Pyne writes to Lady Esther from his hotel room and encloses a cutting of his "personal" advert from The Times. He duly receives a request to visit the woman and goes to her house. There they talk of England. Pyne talks at length of people, places and social events as frequented by all classes of people. Lady Esther is obviously pining for home but states that she can never return. Pyne responds that he already knows the reason why. 

Pyne takes her through the story of the German pilot and asks if she would receive him. Lady Esther refuses and he accuses her of play-acting – but not to cover up a murder. He knows that she is the companion – Muriel King – and that it was Lady Esther who died, not the other girl. Muriel tells of the real sequence of events. Lady Esther was jealous of Herr Schlagal's infatuation with Muriel and turned on her in her madness. She fell by accident. Muriel was terrified of being accused of her murder, put the breakfast tray down by the body. and adopted her identity. She refused to see anyone in case they spotted the substitution. The new consul was one of the people who had never met the real Lady Esther and therefore was not suspicious. Pyne knew something was wrong when he heard of Lady Esther's "dark, flashing eyes". He knew that Esther's parents were both blue-eyed. His talk of England confirmed his suspicions. The supposed titled lady in front of him did not react to stories of high society events, but her face showed how much she missed the everyday life of ordinary people. He promises to help her convince people of her innocence and effect a reunion with Herr Shlagal.

 The Pearl of Price 

Parker Pyne is with a party of people who have travelled through Jordan from Amman to Petra. His companions are Caleb Blundell, an American millionaire, his daughter Carol and secretary, Jim Hurst, Sir Donald Marvel, a British MP, Doctor Carver, an archaeologist and Colonel Dubosc, a Frenchman. Camping in the night, Doctor Carver tells the others of the Nabataeans, the traders who built the city and who were no more than professional racketeers who controlled the trade routes of the area. This talk prompts a discussion on the nature of honesty, the suggestiveness of people and the riches accumulated by Mr. Blundell. These riches are demonstrated in part by the expensive pearl earrings worn by his daughter, and which keep coming loose. Pyne detects an undercurrent of embarrassment within the discussion.

The next day the party makes its way to the top of a plateau to marvel at the view. When they reach their destination, Carver points out to Carol that she has lost one of her earrings. She is certain that she had it when she reached the plateau. At that moment, Carver had seen it was loose again and had screwed it in for her. They search the ground around them, but the object is not there. The suspicion grows that it has been stolen. Colonel Dubosc demands to be searched to prove his innocence. The others agree, especially Mr. Blundell who states that he has his own reasons for doing so, "though I don't want to state them". The pearl is not found.

Just after lunch, Carol appears in Pyne's tent and employs him to find the pearl. She especially wants to prove the innocence of Jim Hurst who is a reformed thief. He was stealing from her father's house when she met him. She saw how desperate Jim was, and convinced her father to employ him. He has proven his worth and she is in love with him, although Mr. Blundell wants her to marry Sir Donald. Pyne asks why her father wanted to be searched. Carol thinks that he wanted to be searched, because she could think that it was him who stole the pearl. His motive would be to blame Hurst and to not let him marry Carol.

Pyne agrees to help and after a small amount of thought confronts Doctor Carver. The archaeologist admits that he took the pearl, wrapping it in a small piece of plasticine that he carries to take imprints from carvings. The comments made about the suggestiveness of people prompted him to tell Carol that the jewel was loose and to offer to fix it back into place. In fact, this was a pretext to take the jewel from her. He was planning to use the enormous price the earring would fetch to finance an archaeological expedition. Pyne replies by informing him that this plan would not have worked. The pearl is worthless, and Blundell's boasting of his riches the previous night was bluff. His fortune has been badly affected in the economic slump.

Death on the Nile

Parker Pyne is in Egypt, and is about to start a journey on a Nile steamer. The only other passengers on the vessel are Sir George and Lady Grayle, her niece Pamela, her nurse, Elsie MacNaughton and Sir George's young secretary, Basil West. Sir George married Lady Grayle to try to find a way out of his financial difficulties but the price he has paid is in having a difficult, bad-tempered, hypochondriac for a wife. Lady Grayle is annoyed that Pyne is on the boat, having been assured that her party would be the only people on board. Pamela is not sympathetic to her aunt's complaints, telling Sir George that his wife's claims of illness are fraudulent and feeling appreciative of the problems Miss MacNaughton faces in dealing with her. The only person who does not seem to find her too much of a trial is Basil West, who has an easy-going relationship with everyone he meets.

Pyne is surprised to receive a note from Lady Grayle. She is asking him not to leave the boat for an excursion to the Temple of Abydos, but to instead meet her for a consultation. He does so and she asks him to find out if her husband is poisoning her. She has been unwell for some time when she is with him. She recovers when he is away. Pyne suspects that there is more to the matter than she is telling him. He voices this suspicion and, in doing so, offends his latest client. Lady Grayle walks off in a huff. Soon afterwards, Miss MacNaughton appears and voices almost the same concern – that Lady Grayle is being poisoned. But she does not want to suspect Sir George, even though she has also spotted the timing of the Lady's recoveries being linked to his absences.

That night, Pyne is summoned to Lady Grayle's room where the woman is very ill. She dies, showing the unmistakable symptoms of strychnine poisoning. Remembering when he saw the victim earlier on burning a letter in the lounge cabin, Pyne hurries there and retrieves a scrap of paper which has "...chet of dreams. Burn this!" written on it.

The evidence seems insurmountable; packets of strychnine have been found in Sir George's cabin and in the pocket of his dinner jacket. The powder itself came from Miss MacNaughton who carried some on her for her patient's supposed heart trouble. Pyne speaks with Pamela, who thinks that Lady Grayle poisoned herself. She tells him that her aunt has been acting strangely lately, imagining all sorts of things. Her delusions including Basil being in love with her.

Pyne then sees Basil and asks him to write out his confession; he made love to the older lady but planned to slowly poison her and make sure the blame would be laid at the husband's door. He would then marry the rich niece. Pyne tells him that the final note he sent to Lady Grayle, with a "cachet of dreams" to take was not burnt, despite his instruction to do so, as she kept all of his letters to her (a bluff by Pyne). Basil falls for this deception and implicates himself. The people Pyne has had outside the half-closed door hear this confession. Pyne is determined to have his holiday after all this work and decides to go incognito to Greece.

The Oracle at Delphi

A well-off widow, Mrs Peters is travelling through Greece with her intellectual son, Willard and their retinue of a maid and a chauffeur. She is not enjoying the trip, disliking the basic amenities of the hotels they stay in and not entranced by the sights of the ancient ruins of the region. At Delphi there are four other people in the hotel; an arty mother and daughter, a Mr Thompson who has a reserved manner with anyone who tries conversation with him and a balding middle-aged man who falls into friendly easy conversation with her and who thinks he recognises Mr Thompson.

In the afternoon, Mrs. Peters comes back to her hotel after enjoying a relaxing few hours reading a detective novel in a shady spot only to find that a ransom note has been delivered – her son has been kidnapped and the demand is for ten thousand pounds sterling. Further instructions will be sent the next day but she is not to communicate with the hotel management or the police.

Her new friend notices her distracted manner during the evening meal and sends her a note enclosing his advert from The Times and announcing himself as none other than Parker Pyne. They meet in secret so as not to arouse suspicions, should she be being watched. Pyne advises her to just wait for the second set of instructions. On their way back into the hotel, they bump into Mr. Thompson...

The next day the second note is delivered. This note states that if she does not have the money on her, the kidnappers will accept instead a valuable diamond necklace that they know she carries on her. The necklace must be delivered by tomorrow. When she shows Pyne the note, he concocts a plan to have a friend of his in Athens to make a paste copy of the diamonds and send this to the kidnappers. Mrs Peters agrees and Pyne telephones to his friend. Meanwhile, she keeps both the manager and Mr Thompson occupied, and prevents them from disturbing him. The jeweller friend arrives from Athens, and he makes the paste version. Pyne gives the original back to Mrs Peters, while he goes off to pass the copy to the kidnappers and collect her son.

The next day Mrs Peters is delighted when Willard is returned but shocked to see that his liberator is Mr Thompson. The man explains that overhearing the conversation on the night of the first ransom note between Pyne and Mrs Peters, he followed them and listened to everything they said. The kidnappers' intention all along had been to obtain the necklace. What she thought had been the original, that was handed back to her the day before, was in fact the paste copy. The man calling himself Parker Pyne and his jeweller accomplice are now under lock and key. Mr Thompson explains how he knew something was wrong. He is the real Parker Pyne, travelling incognito as he promised himself on the Nile. When he heard his name mentioned, he knew something was up!

Literary significance and reception

The unnamed reviewer in The New York Times Book Review of 1 January 1935 said, "The stories are sufficiently varied, both as to scene and as to plot, to afford this new detective the widest possible scope for his abilities. Parker Pyne can never supplant Hercule Poirot in the hearts of Agatha Christie's admirers, but he is a welcome addition to her gallery of characters."

In The Observers issue of 18 November 1934, "Torquemada" (Edward Powys Mathers) stated that Christie was, "the only consistently inspired practitioner of an art where ingenuity and industry have so often to substitute for genius." On the subject of this collection, Mr. Mathers said that the book "has a certain appeal to all Agatha Christie fans, and to ourselves and to all lovers of the well-made magazine story."

Robert Barnard: "A mediocre collection. Parker Pyne begins as a consultant Miss Lonelyhearts, ends up as a conventional detective."

References to other works

The Gate of Baghdad twice quotes the poem Gates of Damascus by James Elroy Flecker. As Pyne stands in Damascus he likens the Baghdad Gate that they will go through as the "Gate of Death" however whereas Flecker's poem talks of four gates in the city, in reality there are eight in the ancient walls and none of them is called the Baghdad gate. Christie also referenced the poem in naming her final written work, Postern of Fate (1973).

 Film, TV or theatrical adaptations 

Two of the stories in the collection, The Case of the Middle-Aged Wife and The Case of the Discontented Soldier, were adapted by Thames Television in 1982 as part of their series, The Agatha Christie Hour, which featured ten one-off plays from short stories by the writer. Maurice Denham played Parker Pyne and these episodes were numbers 1 and 5 in the series respectively (see The Hound of Death and The Listerdale Mystery for other episodes in the series).

The Case of the Middle-Aged Wife (1982)Transmitted: 7 September 1982Adaptor: Freda Kelsall Director: Michael SimpsonCast:Maurice Denham played Mr. Parker Pyne
Angela Easterling played Miss Lemon
Nicholas Cook played Eric
Malcolm Hebden played a Waiter
Nick Curtis played a Crooner
Linda Robson played Edna
Monica Grey played a Beautician
Brenda Cowling played Miss Draper
Rupert Frazer played Claude Luttrell
Gwen Watford played Maria Packington
Peter Jones played George Packington
Kate Dorning played Nancy Purvis

The Case of the Discontented Soldier (1982)Transmitted: 5 October 1982Adaptor: T.R. Bowen Director: Michael SimpsonCast:'Maurice Denham played Mr. Parker PyneAngela Easterling played Miss LemonWilliam Gaunt played Major Wilbraham Lally Bowers played Ariadne OliverWalter Gaunt played WallyPeter Brayham played First ThugLewis Fiander played Mr. ReidBarbara New played Mrs. BensonPatricia Garwood played Freda CleggDerek Smee played Head WaiterKaren Mount played English RosePaul Dadson played NevilleJason Norman played CharlieVeronica Strong played Madeleine de SaraTerry Plummer played Second Thug

Publication history

 1934, William Collins & Sons (London), November 1934, Hardcover, 256 pp
 1934, Dodd Mead and Company (New York), 1934, Hardcover, 244 pp
 1951, Dell Books (New York), Paperback, (Dell number 550 [mapback]), 224 pp
 1953, Penguin Books, Paperback, (Penguin number 932), 190 pp
 1962, Fontana Books (Imprint of HarperCollins), Paperback, 158 pp
 1978, Ulverscroft Large-print Edition, Hardcover, 299 pp, 

First publication of stories

Nine of the stories in Parker Pyne Investigates had their true first publication in the US as follows:

 The Case of the Discontented Soldier, The Case of the Distressed Lady, The Case of the City Clerk, The Case of the Discontented Husband and The Case of the Rich Woman all appeared in the August 1932 issue of Cosmopolitan magazine (issue number 554) under the sub-heading of Are You Happy? If Not Consult Mr. Parker Pyne with illustrations by Marshall Frantz.
 Have You Got Everything You Want?, The House at Shiraz, Death on the Nile and The Oracle at Delphi all appeared in the April 1933 issue of Cosmopolitan magazine (issue number 562) under the sub-heading of Have You Got Everything You Want? If Not, Consult Mr. Parker Pyne again with illustrations by Marshall Frantz. The first story was not individually named.

Known publication of the stories in the UK are as follows:

 The Case of the Middle-aged Wife: First published in issue 613 of Woman's Pictorial of 8 October 1932 as The Woman Concerned.
 The Case of the Discontented Soldier: First published in issue 614 of Woman's Pictorial of 15 October 1932 (illustrated by J.A. May and with an additional title of Adventure – By Request)
 The Case of the Distressed Lady: First published in issue 615 of Woman's Pictorial of 22 October 1932 (illustrated by J.A. May and with an additional title of Faked!)
 The Case of the Discontented Husband: First published in issue 616 of Woman's Pictorial of 29 October 1932 (illustrated by J.A. May and with an additional title of His Lady's Affair)
 The Case of the City Clerk: First published in issue 503 of the Strand Magazine in November 1932 under the title of The £10 Adventure.
 Have You Got Everything You Want?, The Gate of Baghdad and The House at Shiraz were all first published in issue 481 of Nash's Pall Mall Magazine in June 1933 under the sub-heading of The Arabian Nights of Parker Pyne. The individual story titles as they appeared in the magazine were On the Orient Express, At the Gate of Baghdad and In the House at Shiraz respectively. Marshall Frantz's illustrations from Cosmopolitan were re-used.
 The Pearl of Price, Death on the Nile and The Oracle at Delphi were all first published in issue 482 of Nash's Pall Mall Magazine in July 1933 under the sub-heading of More Arabian Nights of Parker Pyne. The Pearl of Price appeared under the slightly abridged title of The Pearl. Again, Marshall Frantz's illustrations from Cosmopolitan'' were re-used.

References

External links 
Parker Pyne Investigates at the official Agatha Christie website

1934 short story collections
Short story collections by Agatha Christie
William Collins, Sons books